Bob Murphy (born January 27, 1951) is a Canadian former professional ice hockey player. He was selected by the Vancouver Canucks in the 11th round (102nd overall) of the 1971 NHL Amateur Draft.

Early life 
Murphy was born in 1951 in Toronto, Ontario. He played junior ice hockey with the Weston Dodgers and Cornwall Royals.

Career 
Murphy began his professional career in 1971 with the Syracuse Blazers of the Eastern Hockey League and played five seasons in the minor leagues before retiring following the 1975-76 season as a member of the Maine Nordiques of the North American Hockey League.

Murphy played 298 professional games, scoring 113 goals and 268 points, while racking up 247 penalty minutes.

References

External links

1951 births
Canadian ice hockey forwards
Cape Cod Cubs (EHL) players
Cornwall Royals (QMJHL) players
Living people
Maine Nordiques players
Mohawk Valley Comets players
Rochester Americans players
Ice hockey people from Toronto
Syracuse Blazers players
Vancouver Canucks draft picks